Seligmanite is a rare mineral, with the chemical formula PbCuAsS3. Originally described from the Lengenbach Quarry, Valais Canton, Switzerland; it has also been found in the Raura district, Lima Region, Peru; at Tsumeb, Oshikoto Region, Namibia; and at the Sterling Mine, Sussex County, New Jersey, US.

References

Lead minerals
Copper(I) minerals
Arsenic minerals
Sulfosalt minerals
Orthorhombic minerals
Minerals in space group 59